Alberts Bels, pseudonym for Jānis Cīrulis (born 1938) is a Latvian writer.

Biography
Alberts Bels studied electrical engineering during the 1950s and also attended the Moscow Circus Art School. Since 1963 he has been active as a full-time writer. His first novel was published in 1967. His work has been described as psychologically rich fiction and several of his books have been adapted as films. He has also been politically active and one of his novels was censored by the Soviet authorities during the 1960s. He was a member of the Supreme Council of the Republic of Latvia and has been awarded the Commemorative Medal for Participants of the Barricades of 1991, an award given to those who participated in the confrontation with Soviet forces in 1991 known as The Barricades. He is an honorary member of the Latvian Academy of Sciences and has been awarded the Order of the Three Stars (3rd class).

References

1938 births
Living people
People from Ropaži Municipality
Deputies of the Supreme Council of the Republic of Latvia
Latvian writers